Beautiful Decay is the second extended play (EP) by Welsh indie rock band Catfish and the Bottlemen. Released on 10 March 2010, the EP contained one song that would later be featured in their debut studio album, The Balcony.

Track listing

External links 
Beautiful Decay - Catfish and the Bottlemen at Discogs

2010 EPs
Catfish and the Bottlemen EPs